Ardian Kozniku (born 27 October 1967) is a Kosovan-Croatian professional football coach and former player who most recently was the assistant manager of Al Faisaly.

Playing career

Club
He started his career at Vëllaznimi from Gjakova and was later picked up by Prishtina. He moved to Croatian side Hajduk Split in 1990 and played there until 1994, scoring 90 goals in 169 games in all competitions for them. He then went on to play for French clubs Cannes, Le Havre and Bastia, as well as Cypriot side APOEL, before making his comeback to Croatia in the summer of 1998, signing with Croatia Zagreb. After two and a half seasons at the club, he made a move to Austrian side Kärnten in the winter break of the 2000–01 season and left the club after only six months for Croatian side Hrvatski Dragovoljac, where he finished his career in 2002.

With Hajduk Split, he was the top goalscorer of the opening season of the Prva HNL in 1992, scoring 12 goals. He scored a total of 45 goals in the league.

International
He was an occasional member of the Croatian national team in the 1990s, making seven international caps and scoring two goals. He made his international debut in a friendly match against Slovakia in April 1994 and also made three appearances in Croatia's qualifying campaign for the UEFA Euro 1996, scoring one goal. He was a member of Croatia's bronze medal-winning squad at the 1998 FIFA World Cup, but was left an unused substitute in all of the team's seven matches at the tournament. His last match for Croatia was a friendly against Australia in early June 1998, during the team's preparations for the upcoming World Cup, where he also netted one goal in his team's 7–0 victory.

He also played for Kosovo in unofficial friendly matches against Albania on 14 February 1993 and again on 7 September 2002 against Albania.

Managerial career
In September 2014 Kozniku became a coach of Shkëndija. In May 2021, he assisted Ante Miše to the Kuwaiti league title with Al-Arabi. He later assisted Miše at Saudi Arabian side Al Faisaly FC.

Diving Federation
Kozniku has served two years as the president of the Croatian Diving Federation. His daughter Diana (born 1995), a diver, placed 11th in 1 m springboard at the 2010 European Aquatics Championships.

International goals
Scores and results list Croatia's goal tally first, score column indicates score after each Kozniku goal.

Honours
Hajduk Split
Croatian First League: 1992, 1993–94
Croatian Cup: 1993
Croatian Super Cup: 1992, 1993
Yugoslav Cup: 1991

Cannes
Coupe Gambardella: 1995

Croatia Zagreb
Croatian First League: 1998–99, 1999–00

Kärnten
Austrian Cup: 2000–01
Austrian Super Cup: 2001

Orders
 Order of the Croatian Interlace - 1998

Notes

References

External links
 

1967 births
Living people
Sportspeople from Gjakova
Croatian people of Albanian descent
Croatian people of Kosovan descent
Kosovan emigrants to Croatia
Association football forwards
Yugoslav footballers
Croatian footballers
Croatia international footballers
1998 FIFA World Cup players
Dual internationalists (football)
FC Prishtina players
HNK Hajduk Split players
AS Cannes players
Le Havre AC players
APOEL FC players
SC Bastia players
GNK Dinamo Zagreb players
FC Kärnten players
NK Hrvatski Dragovoljac players
Yugoslav Second League players
Yugoslav First League players
Croatian Football League players
Ligue 1 players
Cypriot First Division players
2. Liga (Austria) players
Croatian expatriate footballers
Expatriate footballers in France
Croatian expatriate sportspeople in France
Expatriate footballers in Cyprus
Croatian expatriate sportspeople in Cyprus
Expatriate footballers in Austria
Croatian expatriate sportspeople in Austria
Croatian football managers
FK Shkëndija managers
Croatian expatriate football managers
Expatriate football managers in North Macedonia
Croatian expatriate sportspeople in North Macedonia
Croatian expatriate sportspeople in Kuwait
Croatian expatriate sportspeople in Saudi Arabia
Croatian sports executives and administrators